The 2015 Capital One Orange Bowl was a college football bowl game that was played on December 31, 2015 at Sun Life Stadium in Miami Gardens, Florida. The 82nd Orange Bowl was a College Football Playoff semifinal with the winner of the game competing against the winner of the 2015 Cotton Bowl: Alabama Crimson Tide football in the 2016 College Football Playoff National Championship, which took place at University of Phoenix Stadium in Glendale, Arizona. It was one of the 2015–16 bowl games that concluded the 2015 FBS football season. The Orange Bowl game is usually played at night, but with a 4 pm starting time, this Orange Bowl game was the first with an afternoon kickoff in 51 years.

The game matched the undefeated and number 1 overall team in the nation, the Clemson Tigers, against the 1 loss Oklahoma Sooners.

This was the fifth overall meeting between these two teams, with the series being tied 2–2. The game was a rematch of the previous year's Russell Athletic Bowl, which Clemson won 40–6.

Teams
The two participants for the game were two of the semifinalists which were the Clemson Tigers and Oklahoma Sooners.

Clemson
Clemson began the season hoping to improve on their 10-3 record from last year. In the preseason poll, the Tigers ranked number 12, and to kick off the season, won their first 3 games. In their 4th game, they faced the undefeated and 6th ranked Notre Dame Fighting Irish, with both teams having playoff aspirations. Despite leading for most of the game, the game came down to a key 2 point conversion stop by Clemson, essentially sealing the game for the Tigers. The Tigers then won 4 more games to finally reach the number 1 ranking in all of the polls, just in time for a huge matchup with the defending ACC Champions, the Florida State Seminoles. Despite losing for most of the first half, Clemson came back in the 2nd half to win the game, 23-13. The Tigers then won the rest of their games, including a matchup with North Carolina in the ACC Championship game. Clemson won the game 45-37, to give Clemson their first ACC Championship since 2011.

Oklahoma
Oklahoma began their season hoping to improve from their 8-5 record from last year and also an annihilation in the Russel Athletic Bowl against Clemson. They were ranked number 19 in the preseason poll, but they won their first 4 games to rise to number 10 in the polls. In their 5th game, they were matched against Texas, a team that was at the time 1-4 and unranked. Oklahoma, despite being huge favorites, were stunned by the Longhorns 24-17, which dropped them to 4-1 and lowered their ranking to 19. Oklahoma responded strong to the loss, churning out 4 straight wins before looking at an extremely tough 3 game stretch which included the undefeated Baylor Bears, the 1 loss TCU Horned Frogs, and the undefeated Oklahoma State Cowboys. Oklahoma defeated undefeated Baylor 44-34, and rose to the number 7 spot in the polls. Later against TCU, Oklahoma dominated for most of the game, and even led 30-13 in the 4th Quarter. However, TCU mounted a furious comeback and had nearly tied the game up at 30, down 1, when TCU coach Gary Patterson decided to go for 2 at the end of the game. TCU was unable to convert the 2 point conversion, and Oklahoma survived. Their final challenge, the Oklahoma State Cowboys, who also had playoff hopes. Oklahoma destroyed their in-state rivals 58-23, and clinched the Big 12 Title.

Game summary

1st quarter 
The game started off with a long Oklahoma drive that ended with a Samaje Perine 1 yard touchdown that put the Sooners up 7-0. The teams then exchanged punts, and then Clemson had a long drive that ended with a field goal, which brought the score to 7-3. Oklahoma was once again forced to punt, and that ended the first quarter, with the score sitting at 7-3.

2nd quarter 
Clemson's drive started off with a 46-yard run from their Heisman finalist quarterback Deshaun Watson. However, it looked like Clemson was going to have to punt when they ran a fake punt, which ended up with a 31-yard pass from Andy Teasdall to Christian Wilkins, a defensive lineman. This play set up a 5-yard touchdown run by Deshaun Watson, which gave Clemson their first lead of the night at 10-7. Oklahoma was then once again forced to punt, and Clemson took advantage, scoring another field goal to go up by 6. Both teams then exchanged field goals, which brought the score to 16-10 in favor of Clemson. With 2:17 remaining, Oklahoma drove down the length of the field to score a touchdown, which gave the Sooners a one-point lead. Clemson had an opportunity to reclaim the lead before halftime after a fake punt, however Watson's pass was later intercepted in the end zone, giving Oklahoma a 17-16 lead going into halftime.

3rd quarter 
Clemson received the opening kickoff and drove down the field during their opening possession of the second half down the field for a touchdown by running back Wayne Gallman, giving Clemson the lead again. Oklahoma on their ensuing possession was forced to punt, however Clemson couldn't capitalize, missing a 47-yard field goal. Oklahoma later got stuffed at Clemson's 30-yard line, turning the ball over on downs. This time, Clemson did capitalize, by running the ball to midfield and later passing the ball to Hunter Renfrow, his first touchdown of the night, increasing Clemson's lead. The remainder of the quarter was scoreless, giving Clemson a 13-point lead with 15 minutes left to play.

4th quarter 
The fourth quarter of the game for the most part was scoreless; but on Clemson's first possession of the quarter, Clemson ran the ball for another touchdown by Wayne Gallman, pushing the lead to 20 points. Oklahoma had several opportunities to score in the red zone, however the pass was intercepted, giving Clemson room to run out the clock. After close to 10 scoreless minutes in the 4th quarter, Clemson shut out Oklahoma in the second half, giving the Tigers a spot in the 2016 National Championship Game in Glendale, Arizona, against the Alabama Crimson Tide.

Scoring Summary

Source:

References

2015–16 NCAA football bowl games
2015–16 College Football Playoff
2015
2015
2015
2015 in sports in Florida
December 2015 sports events in the United States